The celestial equator is the great circle of the imaginary celestial sphere on the same plane as the equator of Earth. By extension, it is also a plane of reference in the equatorial coordinate system. In other words, the celestial equator is an abstract projection of the terrestrial equator into outer space. Due to Earth's axial tilt, the celestial equator is currently inclined by about 23.44° with respect to the ecliptic (the plane of Earth's orbit), but has varied from about 22.0° to 24.5° over the past 5 million years due to perturbation from other planets.

An observer standing on Earth's equator visualizes the celestial equator as a semicircle passing through the zenith, the point directly overhead. As the observer moves north (or south), the celestial equator tilts towards the opposite horizon. The celestial equator is defined to be infinitely distant (since it is on the celestial sphere); thus, the ends of the semicircle always intersect the horizon due east and due west, regardless of the observer's position on Earth. At the poles, the celestial equator coincides with the astronomical horizon. At all latitudes, the celestial equator is a uniform arc or circle because the observer is only finitely far from the plane of the celestial equator, but infinitely far from the celestial equator itself.

Astronomical objects near the celestial equator appear above the horizon from most places on earth, but they culminate (reach the meridian) highest near the equator. The celestial equator currently passes through these constellations:

These are the most globally visible constellations.

Over thousands of years, the orientation of Earth's equator and thus the constellations the celestial equator passes through will change due to axial precession.

Celestial bodies other than Earth also have similarly defined celestial equators.

See also
 Axial precession
 Celestial pole
 Declination
 Rotation around a fixed axis (pole)

References

Equator
Dynamics of the Solar System
Technical factors of astrology
Circles
Planes (geometry)